Alaena lamborni is a butterfly in the family Lycaenidae. It is found in southern Malawi.

It is named for W.A. Lamborn.

References

Butterflies described in 1965
Alaena
Endemic fauna of Malawi
Butterflies of Africa